Uncispionidae is a family of polychaetes belonging to the order Spionida.

Genera:
 Rhamphispio Blake & Maciolek, 2018
 Uncispio Green, 1982
 Uncopherusa Fauchald & Hancock, 1984

References

Polychaetes